Tala (Taala) is a rural locality (a selo), and one of two settlements in Babushkinsky Rural Okrug of Verkhoyansky District in the Sakha Republic, Russia, in addition to Ulakhan-Kyuyol, the administrative center of the Rural Okrug. Its population as of the 2010 Census was 1; up from 0 recorded in the 2002 Census.

References

Notes

Sources
Official website of the Sakha Republic. Registry of the Administrative-Territorial Divisions of the Sakha Republic. Verkhoyansky District. 

Rural localities in Verkhoyansky District